Tauheedul Islam Girls' High School and Sixth Form College (TIGHS) is a secondary school for girls in Beardwood, Blackburn. It was founded by the charitable trust Tauheedul Islam Faith, Education and Community Trust (now known Star Academies). It serves as the flagship school of the trust.

History
The school opened as an independent school in September 1984 with six teachers and 96 students. The school stated that its first building was "very old" at the time.

In 2005, the school became the first Muslim state school in the North West. It had previously been an independent school. The school has been a success in school league tables, with 82% of pupils gaining five or more GCSEs at grade C or above in 2007, compared to the national average of 46.7%.

In September 2013 the school moved to a new campus in the Beardwood area.

In December 2014 the school converted to academy status.

Student dress and personal behaviour
As of September 2013 10% of the school's sixth form students wear niqabs. In the same month, Sunday Times published a headline stating that girls were forced to wear hijabs outside of school. In response, Mufti Hamid Patel, the principal, said that "It is totally incorrect to say that pupils are 'forced' to wear hijab outside of school."

On 17 August 2014, the Sunday Times published an article describing a 'remarkable transformation at the Tauheedul Islam Girls School' and listed a number of changes the school had made. These included: stricter vetting policies for external speakers, girls no longer being required to wear hijabs (if they didn't want to) and inviting a range of speakers from all faiths to address its pupils. As a result, and following no notice Ofsted inspections in July 2014, the school is now seen as a model for other faith schools by the Department for Education.

Awards and nominations
In January 2014, the school was nominated for the Services to Education award at the British Muslim Awards.

References

External links

 
 Tauheedul Islam Girls' High School (Archive)
 Tauheedul Islam Faith, Education and Community Trust (TIFECT)

Star Academies
Islamic schools in England
Secondary schools in Blackburn with Darwen
Girls' schools in Lancashire
Schools in Blackburn
Educational institutions established in 1984
1984 establishments in England
Academies in Blackburn with Darwen